Michael John Flood (born February 23, 1975) is an American attorney, businessman, and politician serving as the U.S. representative for Nebraska's 1st congressional district since July 2022. He previously served two stints as a member of the Nebraska Legislature from the 19th district, from 2005 to 2013 and 2021 to 2022. He served as speaker of the Legislature from 2007 to 2013.

Early life and education
Born in Omaha, Flood was raised in Norfolk, Nebraska. In 1993, he graduated from Norfolk Catholic High School in Norfolk, Nebraska. He received a Bachelor of Arts from the University of Notre Dame in 1997 and a Juris Doctor from the University of Nebraska College of Law in 2001.

Career 
Flood worked at a Norfolk radio station in high school. At the University of Notre Dame, he operated and hosted a show on the campus's radio station. After graduation, he worked as "Sideshow Mike" on WBYT's morning show for a year. Upon his return to Nebraska, he worked as a radio personality at Lincoln-based country station KFGE. In 1999, during his second year of law school, he launched KUSO as the first station in what would become Flood Communications.

As of 2023, he owned 15 radio stations and seven television stations in Nebraska. In 2015, Flood founded the News Channel Nebraska network, in which all television and radio stations participate. NCN is Nebraska's only 24-hour news channel. Flood no longer solely owns the stations, having sold parts of the company to in-state investors. In addition to being the operator of News Channel Nebraska, he was on-air talent, acting as a news reporter and hosting the variety show Quarantine Tonight during the COVID-19 pandemic. Flood is also a named partner in Norfolk-based law firm, Jewell Collins & Flood.

Nebraska Legislature 

In 2004, Flood ran for a seat in the Nebraska Legislature, representing the 19th legislative district, which was coterminous with Madison County and included Norfolk. The incumbent, Gene Tyson, was retiring; Flood ran unopposed for the seat. In 2010, he was named to Time's "40 Under 40" list as one of the rising stars in American politics. During his first stint in the Nebraska Legislature, Flood introduced and successfully passed the Pain-Capable Unborn Child Protection Act, the nation's first 20-week abortion ban. During a special legislative session in 2011, he successfully brokered a compromise that rerouted the Keystone XL pipeline.

Flood left the Nebraska Legislature in 2013 due to term limits. He initially announced that he would run for governor in 2014, but withdrew from the race in December 2012 after his wife was diagnosed with breast cancer.

In August 2019, Flood announced he would run for office for the 2020 cycle in the 19th district, replacing Jim Scheer, who was termed out. Nebraska term limits only restrict consecutive terms. He was unopposed in the 2020 election, and returned to the Legislature for the 2021 legislative session.

U.S. House of Representatives

Elections

2022 special election

On January 16, 2022, Flood announced his candidacy in the 2022 United States House of Representatives elections in Nebraska, challenging the incumbent Republican Jeff Fortenberry to represent Nebraska's 1st congressional district. Fortenberry resigned from office on March 31, 2022, following a felony conviction. His resignation necessitated a special election, for which the Nebraska Republican Party nominated Flood. He defeated Democratic nominee Patty Pansing Brooks by a narrower than expected margin.

2022 
Flood was reelected in November, again defeating Brooks, 58% to 42%.

Tenure 
Flood was sworn into office by Speaker of the House Nancy Pelosi on July 12, 2022.

On August 12, 2022, Flood voted against the Inflation Reduction Act of 2022.

Caucus memberships 

Republican Study Committee 
Republican Main Street Partnership

References

External links
 House website
Campaign website

|-

|-

1975 births
Living people
Republican Party Nebraska state senators
Republican Party members of the United States House of Representatives from Nebraska
Speakers of the Nebraska Legislature
University of Nebraska–Lincoln alumni
University of Notre Dame alumni